Smallbrook Junction railway station is a railway station on the Isle of Wight, England. It is unusual because it has no public access but exists purely to provide a connection between two rail systems.

Another similar station is Manulla Junction in County Mayo, Republic of Ireland. However, that station allows interchange between two national network rail routes, rather than between a network route and a heritage route.

History 
The station was opened in 1991 by British Rail when the Isle of Wight Steam Railway was extended to reach the Island Line, in order to provide a passenger interchange between the two. It is only served on days that both the Island Line and the Steam Railway are open, as there is no access either by path or by road.

Prior to 1991 there was no station on this site, but it was still an important railway junction. "Smallbrook Junction" is the historic name, long predating the station. Between 1875 and 1926 there were two separate lines here, independently run by the Isle of Wight Central Railway and the Isle of Wight Railway. In 1926, following the island's rail network passing to the Southern Railway, a signal box and points were installed at Smallbrook.  From then until 1966, the line was the Junction between the Ryde Pier Head to Ventnor and Ryde Pier Head to Cowes Lines, and was notable for only being operated as such during the summer months when traffic increased. The junction has been featured in many photographs from the time.

If the Isle of Wight Steam Railway achieves its long-term aim of extending to Ryde St. Johns Road, it is likely that Smallbrook Junction station would close.

Flooding 
In October 2000, flooding near the station washed away much of the track ballast on the Island Line.  Due to the dangerous state of the line, and the damage caused to trains by related flooding at Ryde depot, Island Line Trains had to suspend their services for several days.

Similar events occurred in December 2013, closing the line for many weeks.

Services 
On days when the steam railway operates, there is an hourly service in both directions between approximately 09:00 and 16:30.

Gallery

References

External links 

Railway stations on the Isle of Wight
DfT Category F2 stations
Heritage railway stations on the Isle of Wight
Rail junctions in England
Railway stations opened by British Rail
Railway stations built for UK heritage railways
Railway stations in Great Britain opened in 1991
Island Line railway stations (Isle of Wight)
Railway stations in Great Britain without public access
Railway stations in Great Britain without road access
1991 establishments in England
Ryde
Railway stations accessible only by rail